Kostadin Nichev (Bulgarian: Костадин Ничев; born 22 July 1988) is a Bulgarian professional footballer who plays as a defender for Bulgarian Second League club Krumovgrad.

Career
On 11 June 2018, Nichev signed a two year contract with Botev Plovdiv.

References

External links
 

1988 births
Living people
People from Elhovo
Bulgarian footballers
First Professional Football League (Bulgaria) players
Second Professional Football League (Bulgaria) players
FC Lyubimets players
FC Haskovo players
PFC Dobrudzha Dobrich players
OFC Pirin Blagoevgrad players
Botev Plovdiv players
FC Botev Vratsa players
FC Krumovgrad players
Association football defenders